The Buffalo International Jewish Film Festival is the second oldest continuously running annual festival of its kind in the United States. It was founded in 1985 in Buffalo, New York.

External links 

 Official website

Festivals in Buffalo, New York
Film festivals in New York (state)
Jewish film festivals in the United States
Jews and Judaism in Buffalo, New York
Film festivals established in 1985
1985 establishments in New York (state)